Indiscretions of Betty is a 1910 American short silent comedy film released by the Vitagraph Company of America. The film features the first known screen appearance of Mabel Normand. The film's status is currently unknown.  Normand followed the film with D.W. Griffith's Her Awakening.

External links
 

1910 films
1910 comedy films
Silent American comedy films
American silent short films
American black-and-white films
Vitagraph Studios short films
1910 short films
American comedy short films
1910s American films